Centruroides barbudensis is a species of scorpion in the family Buthidae.

It possesses excitatory neurotoxins that act on sodium and potassium channels. Toxic catecholamine-release can cause adrenergic cardiac effects.

Distribution 
This species is endemic to the Lesser Antilles. It is found in Sombrero, Anguilla, Saba, Sint Eustatius, Saint-Martin, Saint-Barthélemy, Antigua, Barbuda, Guadeloupe and Martinique

References

Buthidae
Animals described in 1898
Centruroides